In algebra, a locally compact field is a topological field whose topology forms a locally compact Hausdorff space. The topology (and metric space structure) is essential because it allows one to construct analogues of algebraic number fields in the p-adic context.

Structure

Finite dimensional vector spaces 
One of the useful structure theorems for vector spaces over locally compact fields is that the finite dimensional vector spaces have only an equivalence class of norm: the sup norm pg. 58-59.

Finite field extensions 

Finite Galois extensions 
This is defined asNote the n-th root is required in order to have a well-defined field norm extending the one over  since given any  in the image of  its norm issince it acts as scalar multiplication on the -vector space .

Examples

Finite fields 
All finite fields are locally compact since they can be equipped with the discrete topology. In particular, any field with the discrete topology is locally compact since every point is the neighborhood of itself, and also the closure of the neighborhood, hence is compact.

Local fields 
The main examples of locally compact fields are the p-adic rationals  and finite extensions . Each of these are examples of local fields. Note the algebraic closure  and its completion  are not locally compact fields pg. 72 with their standard topology.

Field extensions of Qp 
Field extensions  can be found by using Hensel's lemma. For example,  has no solutions in  since only equals zero mod  if , but  has no solutions mod . Hence  is a quadratic field extension.

See also

References

Topology

External links 

 Inequality trick https://math.stackexchange.com/a/2252625